Nukusa praeditella is a moth of the family Autostichidae. It is found in Albania, Bosnia and Herzegovina, Croatia, Italy and former Serbia and Montenegro.

The wingspan is 10–15 mm. The forewings are shining yellowish grey. The hindwings are shining yellowish ash-grey.

References

External links
 Images representing  Nukusa praeditella at Consortium for the Barcode of Life

Moths described in 1891
Nukusa
Moths of Europe